Aloe harlana  is a species of Aloe found in eastern Ethiopia. It was first described by Gilbert Reynolds in 1957.

References

External links
 
 

harlana